The 2000 Categoría Primera A season, known as Copa Mustang 2000 for sponsoring purposes, was the 53rd season of the Categoría Primera A, Colombia's top-flight football league. The season started on 12 February and ended on 17 December 2000. América de Cali were the champions, clinching their tenth domestic league title with a 2–0 victory over Deportes Tolima on the final day of the season.

Atlético Nacional were the defending champions, but placed seventh in the aggregate table and thus failed to qualify for the final stage of the competition.

Format 
The season was split into three stages: the first two stages were the Apertura and Finalización tournaments, in which the 16 teams were first divided into two groups of eight teams, playing seven games, and then all teams in the league played each other once for a total of 22 matches. The winners of each tournament earned a berth into the 2001 Copa Libertadores. The third and final stage was played by the top four teams of the aggregate table of both tournaments, who played each other twice to decide the champions of the season, who also qualified for the Copa Libertadores. In case the eventual champion had already won the Apertura or Finalización tournaments, the runners-up of the final stage would take the third Copa Libertadores berth as the season's runners-up.

Teams 
16 teams competed in the season, the top 15 teams of the relegation table of the 1999 season and Real Cartagena, who were promoted as champions of the 1999 Categoría Primera B tournament, replacing Unión Magdalena who were relegated at the end of the previous season.

Torneo Apertura 
The Torneo Apertura (also known as Copa Mustang I) began on 12 February and ended on 2 July.

Standings

Torneo Finalización 
The Torneo Finalización (also known as Copa Mustang II) began on 9 July and ended on 26 November. On 17 September 2000, during the 12th round match between Santa Fe and Deportes Tolima, referee Óscar Ruiz disallowed a goal for Santa Fe scored by Jeffrey Díaz after checking the existence of a handball with the help of a replay of the television broadcast of the match.

Standings

Aggregate table 
An aggregate table known as Reclasificación including the games of both tournaments (Apertura and Finalización) was used to determine the four teams that would advance to the final stage of the tournament, as well as the team to be relegated at the end of the season. The top four teams in this table at the end of the Torneo Finalización advanced to the final stage, while the team placed last was relegated to Categoría Primera B for the following season.

Final stage 
In the third stage of the tournament, the four qualified teams played each other under a double round-robin system with the team with the most points at the end of this stage being declared as the champion.

Top goalscorers 

Source: RSSSF

References

External links 
 Dimayor official website
 Colombia 2000 RSSSF

Categoría Primera A seasons
1
Col